Saidu Umar Kumo (5 November 1959 – 27 December 2020) was a Nigerian politician who was elected Senator of the Gombe Central Constituency, Gombe State, Nigeria at the start of the Nigerian Fourth Republic, contested under the platform of the All Peoples party (APP) which later became the All NIgeria People's Party (ANPP). 
He took office on 29 May 1999.

After taking his seat in the Senate in June 1999, Kumo was appointed to committees on Aviation, Communication, Power & Steel, Finance & Appropriation, Tourism & Culture and Social Development & Sports.
He became Deputy Chairman of the Senate Services Committee.
In April 2002, Kumo spoke out against Borno State Governor Mala Kachallah who had decamped to the People's Democratic Party (PDP), saying he is a politician whose political ship is sinking. He hold a traditional title (Garkuwan Gombe) before his death. He died after short illness from Covid-19 (Corona virus)

Background 
Kumo was made National secretary of the All Nigeria Peoples Party (ANPP).
In 2007, he accepted a position as special advisor to President Umaru Yar'adua, who had been elected on the PDP platform.
In February 2009, he was expelled from his Kumo centre ward in Akko local government of Gombe State, accused of anti-party activities and "connivance" with the ruling PDP.
In February 2010, he described the exit of former military ruler Muhammadu Buhari from the party as "good riddance to bad rubbish". Buhari had been the party's presidential candidate in the 2003 and 2007 elections.

He competed in the 26 April 2011, election for Governor of Gombe State, but was defeated by Ibrahim Hassan Dankwambo of the People's Democratic Party (PDP).
Following the elections, he said "PDP in Gombe State and its allies – INEC, military personnel, police, NYSC members – connived to rig massively in Gombe State in almost all the 2,218 units during the past elections".

Death 
Kumo died on December 27, 2020, from COVID-19 infection.

References

2020 deaths
Nigerian Muslims
Gombe State
Peoples Democratic Party members of the Senate (Nigeria)
All Nigeria Peoples Party politicians
20th-century Nigerian politicians
21st-century Nigerian politicians
Deaths from the COVID-19 pandemic in Nigeria
1959 births